Robert Sturgis Ingersoll, Sr. (December 16, 1891September 12, 1973) was president of the Philadelphia Museum of Art from 1948 to 1964.

Early life and family
Robert Sturgis Ingersoll was born December 16, 1891, in Philadelphia, Pennsylvania, a son of Charles Edward Ingersoll (1860-1932) and Henrietta Auchmuty (née Sturgis) Ingersoll (1864-1944). His father was a financier who was a Delegate to the Democratic National Convention in 1896 from Pennsylvania, and a candidate for United States Congress from Pennsylvania's 7th District in 1902.

His great-grandfather, Charles Jared Ingersoll, was a United States Congressman and United States Attorney from Pennsylvania. His 2nd great-grandfather, Jared Ingersoll, was also a United States Attorney from Pennsylvania, as well as Pennsylvania's Attorney General. Jared also ran as DeWitt Clinton's vice-presidential candidate in the 1812 United States Presidential Election. His 2nd great-uncle, Joseph Reed Ingersoll, was a United States Congressman from Pennsylvania and diplomat.

R.S. Ingersoll's 3rd great-grandfather was Benjamin Chew. His 7th great-grandfather was Thomas Hooker, founder of the Colony of Connecticut.

Ingersoll was named for his maternal grandfather, Robert Shaw Sturgis (1824-1876). His first cousin, Elizabeth Sturgis Potter, married Frank Polk, a United States lawyer and diplomat. Another first cousin was Robert Sturgis Potter (1890-1947), with whom he shared a name. Potter had a son, Robert Sturgis Potter, Jr. (1920-1988), whose daughter, Linda Sophia Potter, is married to Timothy Shriver, member of the Kennedy family.

His great-uncle was Joseph M. Warren, a United States Congressman from New York and one-time mayor of Troy, New York. His second cousin, twice removed is diplomat David McKean (diplomat), a United States Ambassador to Luxembourg under President Barack Obama from 2016 to 2017.

Ingersoll had five siblings: Anna Warren Ingersoll (1887-1980), who never married; Captain Harry Ingersoll (1890-1918), who was killed in action in France during World War I; Charles Jared Ingersoll (1894-1988), named after their ancestor; Susan Brimmer Ingersoll (1896-1987), who married Orville Horwitz Bullitt (1894-1979)- Orville's brother was diplomat William C. Bullitt; and John Hobart Warren Ingersoll (1899-1967). His nephew, Sergeant Charles Jared Ingersoll, Jr. (1923-1944), was killed in action in Italy during World War II.

Career
Ingersoll graduated from Princeton University in 1915. He would serve as President of the Philadelphia Museum of Art from 1948 to 1964. During his time there, he also initiated a Board of Governors for the organization, serving as the board's chairman from 1947 to 1959.

Ingersoll was elected to the American Philosophical Society in 1950.

Personal life
He married Marion Bernard Fowle (1893-1968) and had five children: 
 Robert Sturgis Ingersoll, Jr. (1915-1968); married Harriet Kingston Archer (1916-1995)
 George Fowle Ingersoll (1916-1970); named after Marion's father
 Phebe Warren Ingersoll Benson (1917-1994)
 Charles Edward Ingersoll, II (1922-1982); named after Robert's father
 Harry Ingersoll (1924-1982); named after Robert's late brother

Robert Ingersoll, Jr. had three children
 Robert Sturgis Ingersoll, III (b. 1937), who married Vera Felicity Roosevelt (1939-2000), daughter of Henry Latrobe Roosevelt, Jr., granddaughter of Henry L. Roosevelt, and cousin of United States Presidents Franklin D. Roosevelt and Theodore Roosevelt. Robert and Vera had four children: Archer Sturgis, Julia Story, Eleanor Roosevelt and Isabelle Sturgis Ingersoll.
 Joseph Reed Ingersoll (1940-2018); married Patricia Stockton Royce (1937-2010) and had two sons: Joseph Reed, Jr. and Richard Stockton Ingersoll.
 Stephen Kingston Ingersoll (1943-1966)

References

1891 births
1973 deaths
People associated with the Philadelphia Museum of Art
Burials in Pennsylvania
Members of the American Philosophical Society